Thomas Montgomery Newman (born October 20, 1955) is an American composer and conductor best known for his many film scores. In a career that has spanned over four decades, he has scored numerous films including The Player (1992); The Shawshank Redemption (1994); American Beauty and The Green Mile (both 1999); In the Bedroom (2001); Finding Nemo (2003); Lemony Snicket's A Series of Unfortunate Events (2004); Cinderella Man (2005); WALL-E (2008); the James Bond films Skyfall (2012) and Spectre (2015); Finding Dory (2016); and 1917 (2019). He also composed the music for the 2003 HBO miniseries Angels in America. Throughout his career, he has collaborated extensively with directors such as Sam Mendes, Frank Darabont, Steven Soderbergh, John Madden and John Lee Hancock.

Newman has been nominated for fifteen Academy Awards, tying him with fellow composer Alex North for the most nominations without a win. He has also been nominated for four Golden Globes, and has won two BAFTAs, six Grammys and an Emmy Award. Newman was honored with the Richard Kirk award at the 2000 BMI Film and TV Awards. The award is given annually to a composer who has made significant contributions to film and television music. His achievements have contributed to the Newmans being the most nominated Academy Award extended family, with a collective 92 nominations in various music categories.

Personal life
Born in Los Angeles, California, Newman is the youngest son of composer Alfred Newman (1900–1970), who won the Academy Award for Best Original Score nine times, and Martha Louis Montgomery (1920–2005). He is a member of a film-scoring dynasty in Hollywood that includes his father Alfred, older brother David Newman, younger sister Maria Newman, uncles Lionel Newman and Emil Newman, cousin Randy Newman (also known as a singer and songwriter), and his first cousin, once removed, Joey Newman. His paternal grandparents were Russian Jewish immigrants, and his mother was from Mississippi.

During their upbringing, Martha Newman took her sons to violin lessons in the San Fernando Valley every weekend. Newman later studied composition and orchestration for two years at the University of Southern California, before transferring to Yale University, where he graduated with a Bachelor of Arts in 1977 and a Master of Music in 1978. While at Yale, he met composer Stephen Sondheim, who became an early mentor.

Newman and his wife Ann Marie have three children. They reside in the Pacific Palisades neighborhood of Los Angeles.

Career
At first, Newman was more interested in musical theater than in film composition, working with Sondheim in Broadway plays. Lionel, who succeeded Alfred as music director for 20th Century Fox, gave Thomas his first scoring assignment on a 1979 episode of the series The Paper Chase. In 1983, John Williams, who was a friend of both Alfred and Lionel, invited Newman to work on Return of the Jedi, orchestrating the scene in which Darth Vader dies. Afterward Newman met producer Scott Rudin in New York City and Rudin invited him to compose the score for Reckless (1984). Newman said that he thought "it was a tough job, at first" for requiring him to "develop vocabularies and a sense of procedure", only getting comfortable with writing scores "and not fraudulent in my efforts" after eight years.

In 1992, Newman composed the score for Robert Altman's The Player and Martin Brest's Scent of a Woman.

In 1994, he received his first Academy Award nominations with the scores for Frank Darabont's The Shawshank Redemption and Gillian Armstrong's Little Women. He also scored Jon Avnet's The War. In 1996, he scored Diane Keaton's Unstrung Heroes, receiving yet another Oscar nomination. In 1998, he scored Robert Redford's The Horse Whisperer as well as Martin Brest's Meet Joe Black. In 1999, Newman composed the score to Sam Mendes' first feature film American Beauty, created using mainly percussion instruments. Newman believed the score helped move the film along without disturbing the "moral ambiguity" of the script, saying "It was a real delicate balancing act in terms of what music worked to preserve that.". He received a fourth Oscar nomination for this score, and although he lost again (to John Corigliano for The Red Violin), he did receive a Grammy and a BAFTA.

His critical and commercial success continued in the years to follow with his scores for films such as Steven Soderbergh's Erin Brockovich, and Todd Field's In the Bedroom. He was nominated consecutively for a further three Academy Awards, for Sam Mendes' Road to Perdition (2002), Andrew Stanton's Finding Nemo (2003), and Brad Silberling's Lemony Snicket's A Series of Unfortunate Events (2004). However, he lost on each occasion to Elliot Goldenthal (for Frida), Howard Shore (for The Lord of the Rings: The Return of the King), and Jan A. P. Kaczmarek (for Finding Neverland).

In 2006, he teamed once again with Todd Field for Little Children and Steven Soderbergh for The Good German (he was nominated for latter). At the Oscar ceremony, he appeared in the opening segment by Errol Morris, who jokingly stated that Newman had been nominated for and failed to win an Oscar eight times. Newman replied: "No, I've failed seven but this will be my eighth", and indeed, he again lost, this time to Gustavo Santaolalla for Babel.

His first score since The Good German was for Alan Ball's Towelhead. In 2008 he scored the animated film WALL-E, collaborating for the second time with director Andrew Stanton (with the first collaboration being Finding Nemo). The film won the Academy Award for Best Animated Feature (as had Nemo). Newman received two Oscar nominations: one for Best Original Score, and another for Best Original Song for "Down to Earth", which he co-wrote with Peter Gabriel. He was nominated in the Original Score category with two other veteran composers, James Newton Howard and Danny Elfman, both of whom have also been nominated for several Oscars but each time unsuccessfully. Newman lost both the score and song nominations to A R Rahman for his work on Slumdog Millionaire. He and Peter Gabriel did however win a Grammy for "Down to Earth".

In 2008 he also scored Sam Mendes' Revolutionary Road. In 2009, he scored Jim Sheridan's Brothers (the remake of the Susanne Bier film). In 2011, he scored Tate Taylor's The Help, John Madden's The Debt, Phyllida Lloyd's The Iron Lady, and George Nolfi's The Adjustment Bureau.

In 2012, Newman scored John Madden's The Best Exotic Marigold Hotel. He also scored the 23rd James Bond movie Skyfall, which celebrates the film franchise's 50th anniversary. His work on this film earned him his eleventh Oscar nomination and a second BAFTA win.  During 2013, he scored Steven Soderbergh's Side Effects and John Lee Hancock's Saving Mr. Banks. The latter score was very well received by film music critics, earning Newman BAFTA and Oscar nominations for the second consecutive year, both of which he lost to Steven Price for Gravity.

Newman's 2014 projects included David Dobkin's The Judge and Tate Taylor's Get on Up. In 2015, he scored John Madden's The Second Best Exotic Marigold Hotel, marking the first time Newman has scored a sequel to a film he also wrote the score for. Also that year, Newman returned to score Sam Mendes' 24th James Bond movie Spectre, the sequel to Skyfall. He also collaborated with Steven Spielberg for Bridge of Spies, marking Newman's first collaboration with Spielberg and the first Spielberg film not to feature a musical score from his long-time composer John Williams, since the production of The Color Purple in 1985. For his score on Bridge of Spies, Newman garnered additional Oscar and Grammy nominations.

In 2016, Newman scored the motion picture Morten Tyldum's Passengers starring Chris Pratt, Jennifer Lawrence, Michael Sheen, and Laurence Fishburne, for which he received his 14th Oscar nomination. Three years later, Newman reunited with Sam Mendes for his war film 1917, for which Newman received his 6th BAFTA and 15th Oscar nominations.

Newman likes to vary the instrumentation in his scores, ranging from full orchestra to percussion-only music. He is also fond of incorporating unusual instruments such as the zither, hurdy-gurdy, psaltery and hammered dulcimer, or unexpected sounds, like Aboriginal chants and the chirping of cicadas. The composer declared that he has "an interest in mundane experimentation."

Filmography

Film

1980s

1990s

2000s

2010s

2020s

Television

Additional soundtracks and music
 2001: Hearts in Atlantis (Trailer) (from How to Make an American Quilt)
 2003: Finding Nemo (Teaser Trailer) (from Scent of a Woman)
 2005: Brokeback Mountain (Trailer) (from The Shawshank Redemption)
 2005: Corpse Bride (Trailer) (from Lemony Snicket's A Series of Unfortunate Events)
 2005: Madagascar (from American Beauty)
 2005: Fun with Dick and Jane (from Lemony Snicket's A Series of Unfortunate Events)
 2006: Eight Below (Trailer) (from Finding Nemo)
 2007: Sicko (from Little Children, Lemony Snicket's A Series of Unfortunate Events and In the Bedroom)
 2007: No Reservations (Trailer) (from Lemony Snicket's A Series of Unfortunate Events and American Beauty)
 2009: Bigfoot (Trailer) (from WALL-E)
 2010: Alice in Wonderland (Teaser Trailer) (from Lemony Snicket's A Series of Unfortunate Events)

Newman has also composed music for television, including theme music for the series Boston Public and the miniseries Angels in America. His theme music for the television show Six Feet Under won two Grammy Awards in 2003, for Best Instrumental Composition as well as Best Instrumental Arrangement. He also wrote the theme for the HBO series Newsroom.

Newman also wrote a commissioned concert work for orchestra, Reach Forth Our Hands, for the 1996 Cleveland Bicentennial. The Los Angeles Philharmonic commissioned an orchestral work by Newman, It Got Dark, which was performed by the Kronos Quartet and Los Angeles Philharmonic and conducted by Leonard Slatkin during the orchestra's 2009–2010 season.

He composed the incidental music for the Washington Shakespeare Theatre Company's 2014 production of As You Like It, directed by Michael Attenborough and starring Zoe Waites.

He also collaborated with composer and multi-instrumentalist Rick Cox in an electro-acoustic album 35 Whirlpools Below Sound; which is released under the label Cold Blue Music in 2014.

Awards and nominations

References

External links

 

1955 births
20th-century American composers
20th-century American male musicians
21st-century American composers
21st-century American male musicians
American film score composers
American male film score composers
American people of Russian-Jewish descent
American television composers
Animated film score composers
Annie Award winners
Best Original Music BAFTA Award winners
Emmy Award winners
Grammy Award winners
Jewish American film score composers
Jewish American television composers
La-La Land Records artists
Living people
Male television composers
Musicians from Los Angeles
Thomas
Pixar people
DreamWorks Animation people
Sony Pictures Animation people
Varèse Sarabande Records artists